Brenda Starr is a 1976 American made-for-television adventure film based on Dale Messick's comic strip Brenda Starr, Reporter starring Jill St. John in the title role. It is directed by Mel Stuart and originally aired on ABC on May 8, 1976.

Cast
Jill St. John as Brenda Starr
Jed Allen as Roger Randall
Sorrell Booke as A J Livwright
Tabi Cooper as Hank O'Hare
Victor Buono as Lance O'Toole
Joel Fabiani as Carlos Vegas
Barbara Luna as Luisa Santamaria
Marcia Strassman as Kentucky Smith
Torin Thatcher as Lassiter
Arthur Roberts a Dax Leander
Roy Applegate as Tommy

Production
Jill St John told her press agent that she had a dream to play Brenda Starr. The agent optioned the rights and had a script written. The movie was shot as a pilot for a series but fell flat as a stand-alone project.

References

External links
Brenda Starr at TCMDB
Brenda Starr at IMDb

1976 television films
1976 films
1970s adventure films
ABC network original films
American television films
American adventure films
Films based on comic strips
Films directed by Mel Stuart
Films scored by Lalo Schifrin
Live-action films based on comics
1970s American films